Jesús Villasante is the head Net Innovation Unit of the Communications Networks, Content and Technology (Connect) Directorate General in the European Commission.

He read Telecommunications Engineering at the Technical University of Madrid in Madrid, Spain and later obtained a master's degree in Public Management from the Université libre de Bruxelles in Brussels, Belgium.

See also
 CNet news IT giants accused of exploiting open source
  Jesús Villasante, Future Internet Assembly

References

Living people
Year of birth missing (living people)
Place of birth missing (living people)